DRF may refer to:
 Depression range finder, a fire control device used to observe the target's range and bearing to calculate firing solutions
 Dabur Research Foundation, an Indian contract research organization offering pre-clinical services in drug discovery and development
 DRF Luftrettung, part of the German emergency medical services, formerly Deutsche Rettungsflugwacht e.V.
 Fundamental research division, a division of the French Alternative Energies and Atomic Energy Commission
 Daylight redirecting film, a thin, flexible plastic film which can be applied to a window to refract or reflect incoming light upwards
 .drf: a camera raw image format (Kodak)